Pervomaysky is a rural locality (a selo) and the administrative centre of Pervomaysky Selsoviet, Salavatsky District, Bashkortostan, Russia. The population was 395 as of 2010. There are 11 streets.

Geography 
Pervomaysky is located 60 km southeast of Maloyaz (the district's administrative centre) by road. Pokrovka is the nearest rural locality.

References 

Rural localities in Salavatsky District